Newton is the stage name for the UK firefighter turned pop singer, Billy Myers (born William Myers, 3 June 1967). He is best known as a cover artist, with success in Australia and the United Kingdom.

Career
In 1994, Newton released his debut single, "Sky High", a cover of the 1975 hit by Jigsaw, which was produced by Mike Stock and Matt Aitken. "Sky High" peaked at number 8 in Australia in April 1995 and was certified gold.

In 1996, Newton released "Sometimes When We Touch", a cover of Dan Hill's hit, which peaked at number 5 in Australia and was also certified gold. It peaked at number 32 in the United Kingdom.  Singles "Don't Worry", "We're All Alone" and "How Long" followed in 1997, all lifted from his debut studio album Sweetest Secret. In 1998, two further singles were released, "He Don't Love You (Like I Love You)" and "All Out of Love" with limited chart success.

In 2012, Newton returned with a second studio album titled Time to Believe.

Discography

Albums

Singles

References

External links
Newton's Myspace
Page containing the music video for Newton's hit "Skyhigh"

1967 births
Living people
Singers from Manchester
English male singers
English pop singers
British firefighters